Empower is a retirement plan recordkeeping financial holding company based in Greenwood Village, Colorado, United States. It is the second-largest retirement plan provider in the United States.

History
Empower was created in 1891, when parent company Great-West Lifeco was founded as an insurance provider on the Canadian prairie. After serving more than a century of expansion and a profound evolution of service offerings, the modern iteration of Empower was launched in 2014, when the retirement businesses of Great-West Life combined the record-keeping services of Great-West Financial, JPMorgan Chase, and Putnam Investments. Part of Great-West Life & Annuity Insurance Company, Empower is an indirect wholly owned subsidiary of Great-West Lifeco. Empower is led by President and CEO Edmund F. Murphy III.

In 2019, Empower signed a 21-season contract to the naming rights of the Denver Broncos stadium, named Empower Field at Mile High.

In June 2020, the company announced its acquisition of Personal Capital, an investment and wealth management adviser, for $825 million. As of June 2020, Empower has administered more than $1.0 trillion in assets for 12.0 million individuals over 67,000 Organization  retirement plan participants. In September 2020, the company also acquired the retirement plan business of MassMutual for $4.4 billion.

Empower acquired the heritage SunTrust 401(k) recordkeeping business, which includes approximately 300 retirement plans consisting of more than 73,000 plan participants and $5 billion in plan assets.

On September 29, 2020, Empower announced that it would acquire the retirement plan recordkeeping business of Fifth Third Bank.

February 1, 2022, "Empower" replaced "Empower Retirement" as the company's public-facing brand name.

April 4, 2022 Empower acquired Prudential’s full service retirement.

Companies
Personal Capital

References

External links

Financial services companies of the United States
Companies based in Greenwood Village, Colorado
American subsidiaries of foreign companies
Financial services companies established in 1891
Retirement plans in the United States
1891 establishments in Colorado
1891 establishments in the United States
Companies established in 1891
Financial services
American companies established in 1891